Blanca Lucrecia Sacancela Quishpe is an Ecuadorian politician.

Life
Sacancela is a member of Ecuador's National Assembly and a member of the Permanent Commission of the Economic and Tax Regime and its Regulation and Control.

In January 2022, she presented her draft of an Organic Law of Communes and Communities to the National Assembly.

In June 2022, Yeseña Guamaní was called to defend a charge of breach of duties. A hearing was established which included assembly members Wilma Andrade, Ana Belén Cordero, Vanessa Freire and Sacancela.

References 

21st-century Ecuadorian women politicians
21st-century Ecuadorian politicians
Living people
Year of birth missing (living people)